Don Macpherson (born 1947) is a Canadian journalist. He is the Quebec affairs columnist for the Montreal Gazette. He has covered Quebec political affairs since 1985.

Macpherson, who is of Scottish origin, was raised in the Montreal neighbourhood of Rosemont. He attended McGill University and wrote for The McGill Daily.

He began his journalistic career in the 1960s with The Canadian Press, where he was, he says, often assigned to cover the riots. He later covered Quebec politics for The Montreal Star and the Canadian Broadcasting Corporation before joining The Gazette.

References

External links
The Gazette: Opinion Columnists - Don Macpherson

Living people
1947 births
Writers from Montreal
Canadian columnists
McGill University alumni
Anglophone Quebec people
Canadian people of Scottish descent
Montreal Gazette people